Falcón State is a state on the coast in the northwestern part of the country of Venezuela. Falcón State covers a total surface area of 24,800 km² and, in 2010, had an estimated population of 950,057. There are four national parks in the state: the Médanos de Coro National Park, the Cueva de la Quebrada del Toro, Morrocoy, and Juan Crisóstomo Falcón National Park. 

A large number of species of terrestrial, freshwater and marine molluscs are found in the wild in Falcón State. However, most of the marine mollusks in the area are the same species that occur elsewhere in the Caribbean faunal zone. 

This is a partial list of the molluscs of Falcón State. The families are listed alphabetically within the classes. Whether the family is marine, terrestrial or freshwater is indicated after the name of the family, but there is no attempt to separate marine species from non-marine species.

Class Gastropoda 
Achatinidae – terrestrial
 Achatina fulica (Bowdick, 1822)

Acmaeidae – marine 
 Patelloida pustulata (Helbling, 1779) 
 Tectura antillarum (Sowerby, 1831) 
 Lottia leucopleura (Gmelin, 1791) 
 
Cylichnidae – marine
 Acteocina canaliculata (Say, 1822)  

Aplustridae - marine 
 Hydatina vesicaria (Lightfoot, 1786)

Aplysiidae – marine
 Aplysia dactylomela Rang, 1828  

Ampullariidae - freshwater
 Marisa cornuarietis (Linnaeus, 1756) 
 Pomacea chemnitzii (Philippi, 1852)
 Pomacea falconensis Pain & Arias, 1958
 Pomacea glauca (Linnaeus, 1756)  
 Pomacea superba Marshall, 1928
 
Architectonicidae – marine
 Architectonica nobilis Roding, 1798  
 Heliacus cylindricus (Gmelin, 1791)

Buccinidae – marine 
 Pisania pusio (Linneo, 1758)  
 Pisania auritula (Link, 1807)
 Pisania lineata (Conrad, 1846)
 Engina turbinella (Kiener, 1835)
 Pallacera guadalupensis (Petit, 1852)
 Babylonia areolata (Link, 1807)

Bulimulidae – terrestrial 
 Eudolichotis distorta (Bruguiere)
 Plekocheilus blainvillianus (Pfeiffer)
 
Bullidae – marine
 Bulla striata Bruguiére, 1792  
 Bulla solida (Gmelin, 1791)  

Bursidae – marine
 Bursa bufo (Bruguiere, 1792)  
 Bursa granularis cubaniana (Orbigny, 1842)

Caecidae – marine
 Caecum pulchellum Stimpson, 1851  
 Caecum ryssotitum Folin, 1867  

Cancellariidae – marine 
 Cancellaria reticulata (Linneo, 1767)  

Cassidae – marine
 Phalium granulatum (Borm, 1778)
 Cypraecassis testiculus (Linneo, 1758)  
 Sconsia striata (Lamarck, 1816)
 Cassis madagascariensis Lamarck, 1822
 Cassis tuberosa (Linneo, 1758)

Cerithiidae – marine
 Cerithium litterattum (Born, 1778)  
 Cerithium guinaicum Philippi, 1849  
 Cerithium eburneum Bruguiere, 1792  
 Cerithium lutosum Menke, 1828  
 Cerithium algicola C.B. Adams, 1848
 Cerithium atratum (Born, 1778)  
 Bittium varium (Pfeiffer, 1840)  

Columbellidae – marine
 Columbella mercatoria Linneo, 1758  
 Anachis obesa C.B. Adams, 1845  
 Nitidella laevigata (Linneo, 1758)  
 Mazatlania aciculata (Lamarck, 1822)  
 Rhombinella laevigata (Linneo, 1758)  
 Mitrella argus Orbigny, 1842  

Conidae – marine
 Conus puncticulatus Hwass, 1792  
 Conus mus Hwass, 1792  
 Conus austini Rehder y Abbott, 1951  
 Conus spurius Gmelin, 1791  
Conus centurio Born, 1778

Calyptraeidae – marine
 Calyptraea centralis (Conrad, 1841)  
 Crucibulum marense Weisbord  
 Crucibulum auricula (Gmelin, 1791)  
 Crepidula convexa Say, 1822  
 Crepidula plana Say, 1822  

Cymatiidae – marine
 Cymatium pileare martinianum Orbigny, 1842  
 Cymatium cingulatum (Lamarck, 1822)  
 Cymatium muricinum (Roding, 1798)
 Cymatium parthenopeum (Von Salis, 1793)
 Cymatium moritinctum caribbaeum Clench y Turner, 1957  
 Charonia variegata (Lamarck, 1816)  
 Distorsio clathrata (Lamarck, 1816)  

Cypraeidae – marine 
 Cypraea zebra Linneo, 1758  
 Cypraea spurca acicularis Gmelin, 1791  
 Siphocypraea mus Linneo, 1758  

Dorididae – marine
 Glossodoris bayeri Marcus y Marcus, 1967  

Eratoidae – marine
 Trivia pediculus (Linneo, 1758)  

Epitoniidae – marine
 Epitonium lamellosum (Lamarck, 1822)  

Fasciolariidae – marine 
 Fasciolaria hollisteri (Weisbord, 1962)  
 Leucozonia nassa (Gmelin, 1791)  
 Latirus infundibulum (Gmelin, 1791)  
 Fusinus helenae Bartsch, 1939  
 Fusinus closter (Philippi, 1850)  
 Fusinus bitteri Gibson-Smith  

Ficidae – marine
 Ficus communis Roding, 1798

Fissurellidae – marine
 Fissurella nodosa (Born, 1778)
 Fissurella nimbosa Linneo, 1758  
 Diodora jaumei Aguayo y Rehder, 1936  
 Diodora cayenensis (Lamarck, 1822)
 Diodora tisteri (Orbigny, 1842)
 Hemitoma octoradiata (Gmelin, 1791)  
 Lucapina philippiana (Finlay, 1930)
 Lucapina sowerbyi (Sowerby, 1835)

Haliotidae – marine
 Haliotis pourtalesii Dall, 1881) 
 
Haminoeidae – marine 
 Haminoea antillarum (Orbigny, 1841)  
 Haminoea succinea (Conrad, 1846)

Hipponicidae – marine 
 Hipponix anticuatus (Linneo, 1767)  

Hydrobiidae – freshwater
 Potamopyrgus ernesti (Martens, 1873)  
 
Janthinidae – marine
 Jantina globosa Swainson, 1822  

Littorinidae – marine 
 Littorina nebulosa (Lamarck, 1822)
 Littorina angulifera (Lamarck, 1822)  
 Littorina lineolata Orbigny, 1840  
 Littorina angustior Morch, 1876  
 Nodilittorina tuberculata (Menke, 1828)  
 Tectarius muricatus (Linneo, 1758)  

Marginellidae – marine
 Marginella prunum (Gmelin, 1791)  
 Marginella circumvitata Weisbord, 1962  
 Persicula interruptolineata (Muhlfeld, 1816)
 Hyalina albolineata (Orbigny, 1842)  

Strophocheilidae – terrestrial
 Megalobulimus oblongus (Müller 1774)    

Ellobiidae – terrestrial
 Melampus coffeus (Linneo, 1758)  

Eulimidae – marine
 Melanella intermedia (Cantraine, 1835)  

Melongenidae – marine
 Melongena melongena (Linneo, 1758)  
 Melongena corona (Gmelin, 1791)  

Mitridae – marine
 Mitra nodulosa (Gmelin, 1791)  

Modulidae – marine
 Modulus modulus (Linneo, 1758)

Muricidae – marine
 Chicoreus brevifrons Lamarck, 1822  
 Morula nodulosa (C.B. Adams, 1845)  
 Murex donmoorei Bullis, 1964  
 Murex cabritii Bemardi, 1859  
 Murex chrysostomus Sowerby, 1834  
 Murex margaritensis Abbott, 1958  
 Murex formosus Sowerby, 1841  
 Purpura patula Linneo, 1758  
 Thais rustica (Lamarck, 1822)
 Thais deltoidea (Lamarck, 1822)  
 Thais haemastoma floridana Conrad, 1837  

Naticidae – marine
 Naticarius canrena (Linneo, 1758)  
 Natica marochiensis (Gmelin, 1791)  
 Polinices hepaticus (Roding, 1798)  
 Polinices lacteus (Guilding, 1834)
 Sinum maculatum (Say, 1831)

Nassariidae – marine 
 Nassarius vibex (Say, 1822)  

Neocyclotidae – terrestrial
 Poteria dysoni (Pfeifer)  

Neritidae – marine and freshwater
 Nerita peloronta Linneo, 1758 
 Nerita versicolor Gmelin, 1791 
 Nerita tesselata Gmelin, 1791 
 Nerita fulgurans Gmelin, 1791 
 Neritina meleagris Lamarck, 1822 
 Neritina piratica Russel, 1940  
 Neritina virginea (Linneo, 1758) 
 Neritina reclivata (Say, 1822) 
 Smaragdia viridis maris (Linneo, 1758) 

Olividae – marine
 Oliva schepmani Weisbord, 1962  
 Oliva scripta Lamarck, 1810  
 Olivella minuta (Link, 1807)  
 Ancilla glabrata (Linneo, 1758)  

Orthalicidae – terrestrial
 Drymaeus knorri (Pfeffer, 1846)   
 Orthalicus maracaibensis (Pfeiffer)   

Ovulidae – marine 
 Cyphoma intermedium Cate, 1973  
 Cyphoma gibbosum (Linneo, 1758)  

Pachychilidae – terrestrial
 Pachychilus laevisimus (Sowerby, 1824)   

Phasianellidae – marine
 Tricolia affinis (C.B. Adams, 1850)  
 Tricolia thalassicola Robertson, 1958  
 Tricolia tessellata (Potiez y Hichaud, 1838)

Planaxidae – marine
 Planaxis nucleus (Bruguiere, 1789)  

Planorbidae – freshwater
 Drepanotrema aheum Baker, 1930    
 Drepanotrema cimex pistiae Baker, 1930   

Pleurodontidae – terrestrial 
 Labyrinthus leucodon (Pfeiffer, 1847)
 Labyrinthus umbrus (Thompson, 1957)

Potamididae – marine
 Cerithidea costata (Da Costa, 1778)  
 Batillaria minima (Gmelin, 1791)

Rissoinidae – marine
 Rissoina fischeri Desjardin, 1949  
 Rissoina bryerea (Montagu, 1803)  
 Rissoina decussata (Montagu, 1803)
 Zebina browniana (Orbigny, 1842)
 Alvania auberiana (Orbigny, 1842)

Siphonariidae – marine
 Siphonaria pectinata (Linneo, 1758)  

Strombidae – marine
 Strombus pugilis Linneo, 1758  
 Strombus raninus Gmelin, 1791
 Strombus gigas Linneo, 1758  

Subulinidae – terrestrial
 Leptinaria lamellata (Potiez & Michaud, 1838)   
 Opeas beckianum (Pfeifer)   
 Opeas pumilium (Pfeifer)   
 Subulina octona (Bruguièri, 1792)   

Terebridae – marine 
 Terebra protexta Conrad 1845  
 Terebra cinerea (Born, 1778)  
 Terebra taurina Lightfoot, 1786  

Thiaridae – freshwater 
 Thira granifera (Lamarck, 1816)    
 Melanoides tuberculata (Múller, 1774)    

Tonnidae – marine
 Tonna maculosa (Dillwyn, 1817)  
 Tonna galea (Linneo, 1758)  

Trochidae – marine
 Cittarium pica (Linneo, 1758)  
 Calliostoma pulchrum (C.B. Adams, 1850)  
 Calliostoma sarcodulum Dall  
 Tegula fasciata (Born, 1778)  
 Tegula viridula (Gmelin, 1791)  

Turbinellidae – marine
 Turbinella angulata (Lightfoot, 1786)  
 Vasum muricatum (Born, 1778)

Turbinidae – marine 
 Turbo castanea Gmelin, 1791
 Astraea brevispina (Lamarck, 1822)  
 Astraea tuber (Linneo, 1767)  
 Astraea caelata (Gmelin, 1791)  

Turridae – marine
 Fusiturrieula pauletae Princz, 1978  
 Polystira albida (Perry, 1811)  
 Drillia gibbosa (Born, 1778)  
 Hindsiclava consors (Sowerby)  
 Pyrgocythara candidissima (C.B. Adams, 1845)  

Turritellidae – marine
 Turritella variegata (Linneo, 1758)  
 Turritella paraguanensis F. Hudson  

Urocoptidae – terrestrial
 Brachypodella hanleyana (Pfeiffer)   
 Brachypodella leucopleura (Menke, 1847)   

Vermetidae – marine
 Serpulorbis decussatus (Gmelin, 1791)  

Vitrinellidae – marine
 Teinostoma megastoma (C.B. Adams, 1850)  

Volutidae – marine
 Voluta musica Linneo, 1758

Class Bivalvia 

Arcidae - marine
 Arca zebra (Swainson, 1833)  
 Arca imbricada Bruguiere, 1789  
 Barbatia candida (Helbling, 1779)  
 Barbatia tenera (C.B. Adams, 1845)  
 Barbatia cancellaria (Lamarck, 1819)  
 Barbatia dominguensis (Lamarck, 1819)  
 Anadara floridana (Comad, 1869)
 Anadara brasiliana (Lamarck, 1819)  
 Anadara notabilis (Roding, 1798)  
 Anadara chemnitzii (Philippi, 1851)  
 Anadara ovalis (Bruguiere, 1789)  
 Anadara baughmani Hertlein, 1951  
 Noetia bisulcata (Lamarck, 1819)  
 Arcopsis adamsi (Dall, 1886)  

Cardiidae - marine 
 Trachycardium isocardia (Linneo, 1758)  
 Trachycardium muricatum (Linneo, 1758)  
 Papyridea soleniformis (Bruguiere, 1789
 Trigonocardia antillarum (Orbigny, 1842)  
 Laevicardium laevigatum (Linneo, 1758)  
 Crassinella martinicensis (Orbigny, 1842)  

Carditidae - marine
 Carditamera gracilis (Shuttleworth, 1856)  

Chamidae - marine
 Chama lactuca Dall, 1886  
 Chama macerophylla (Gmelin, 1791)  
 Chama florida Lamarck, 1819  
 Pseudochama radians (Lamarck, 1819)  
 Arcinella arcinella (Unneo, 1767)
 Arcinella corneta Comad, 1866  

Corbulidae - marine
 Corbula aequivalvis Philippi, 1836  
 Corbula contracta Say, 1822  
 Corbula caribaea Orbigny, 1842  

Crassatellidae - marine
 Eucrassatella antillarum (Reeve, 1842)  

Donacidae - marine
 Donax denticulatus Linneo, 1758  
 Donax striatus Linneo, 1767  
 Donax higuerotensis  

Dreissenidae - marine
 Mytilopsis sallei Récluz, 1849  

Glycymeridae - marine
 Glycymeris castaneus Lamarck  
 Glycymeris pectinata (Gmelin, 1791)
 
Isognomonidae - marine
 Isognomon alatus (Gmelin, 1791)  

Limidae - marine
 Lima scabra (Born, 1778)  
 Lima pellucida C.B. Adams, 1846  

Lucinidae - marine
 Lucina pectinata (Gmelin, 1791)  
 Lucina muricata (Spengler, 1798)  
 Lucina radians (Conrad, 1841)
 Codakia orbicularis (Linneo, 1758)
 Codakia orbiculata (Montagu, 1808)
 Codakia costata (Orbigny, 1842)
 Divaricella quadrisulcata (Orbigny, 1842)
 Anodontia alba Link, 1807  

Mactridae - marine
 Mactra fragilis Gmelin, 1791  
 Mactrellona alata (Spengler, 1802)  
 Mactrellona iheringi (Dall, 1897)  
 Mulinia cleryana (Orbigny, 1846)  
 Raeta plicatella (Lamarck, 1818)  
 Anatina anatina (Spengler, 1802)  

Mytilidae - marine
 Brachidontes modiolus (Linneo, 1767)  
 Brachidontes exustus (Linneo, 1758)  
 Brachidontes dominguensis (Lamarck, 1819)  
 Modiolus americanus (Leach, 1815)  
 Musculus lateralis (Say, 1822)  
 Perna perna (Linneo, 1758)  
 Amydalum papyrium (Conrad, 1846)  

Nuculanidae - marine
 Nuculana acuta (Conrad, 1831)  
 Adrana tellinoides (Sowerby, 1823)  
 Adrana gloriosa A. Adams  

Nuculidae - marine
 Nucula mareana Weisbord, 1964. 

Ostreidae - marine
 Crassostrea rhizophorae (Guilding, 1828)  
 Lopho frons (Linneo, 1758)  

Pectinidae - marine
 Pecten ziczac (Linneo, 1758)
 Amusium papyraceum (Gabb, 1873)  
 Amusium laurenti (Gmelin, 1791)  
 Aequipecten lineolaris (Lamarck, 1819
 Ch1amys muscosa (Wood, 1828)  
 Aequipecten acanthodes (Dall, 1925)  
 Argopecten gibbus (Linneo, 1758)  
 Argopecten nucleus (Born, 1778)  
 Argopecten irradian amplicostatus Dall, 1898  
 Lyropecten nodosus (Linneo, 1758)  

Periplomatidae - marine
 Periploma margaritacea (Lamarck, 1801)

Pinnidae - marine
 Atrina rigida (Lightfoot, 1786)
 Atrina venezuelana  
 Atrina bitteri Gibson-Smith  
 Atrina seminuda (Lamark, 1819)  
 Pinna carnea Gmelin, 1791  

Pholadidae - marine
 Pholas campechiensis Gmelin, 1791  
 Martesia fragilis Verril y Bush, 1890  
 Martesia cuneiformis (Say, 1822)

Plicatulidae - marine
 Plicatula gibbosa Lamarck, 180l  

Psammobiidae - marine
 Sanguinolaria cruenta (Lightfoot, 1786)  
 Heterodonax bimaculatus (Linneo, 1758)  

Pteriidae - marine
 Pinctada imbricata Réiding, 1798  
 Pteria colymbus (Réiding, 1798)  

Semelidae - marine
 Semele projicua (Pulteney, 1799)  

Solecurtidae - marine
 Tagelus divisus (Spengler, 1794)
 Tagelus plebeius (Lightfoot, 1786)

Solenidae - marine
 Solen obliquus Spengler, 1794  

Spondylidae - marine
 Spondylus ictericus Reeve, 1856  
 Spondylus americanus Hermann, 1781  

Tellinidae - marine
 Tellina fausta Pultency, 1799  
 Tellina lineata Turton, 1819  
 Tellina listeri Roding, 1798
 Tellina punicea Born, 1778  
 Tellina tirata Turton, 1819  
 Tellina sandix Boss, 1968  
 Tellina exerythra Boss, 1964
 Macoma constricta (Bruguiere, 1792)  
 Macoma tageliformis Dall, 1900  
 Macoma brasiliana Dall  
 Macoma brevifrons (Say, 1834)
 Strigilla pseudocarnaria Boss, 1969  
 Strigilla producta Tryon, 1870  
 Psammotreta brevifrons (Say, 1834)  

Thraciidae - marine
 Cyathodonta magnifica Jonas, 1850  

Ungulinidae - marine
 Diplodonta candeana (Orbigny, 1842)  
 Diplodonta semiaspera (Philippi, 1836)  

Veneridae - marine
 Circomphalus strigillinus (Dall, 1902)  
 Periglypta listeri (Gray, 1838)
 Ventricolaria rigida (Dillwyn, 1817)  
 Chione cancellata (Linneo, 1767)  
 Chione paphia (Linneo, 1767)  
 Chione pubera (Bory-Saint-Vicent, 1827)  
 Anomalocardia brasiliana (Gmelin, 1791)  
 Protothaca granulata (Gmelin, 1791)  
 Tivela mactroides (Born, 1778)
 Pitar arestus (Dall y Simpson, 1901)
 Pitar dione (Linneo, 1758)
 Pitar circinatus (Born, 1778)  
 Pitar fulminatus (Menke, 1828)  
 Pitar albidus (Gmelin, 1791)
 Macrocallista maculata (Linneo, 1758)  
 Cyclinella tenuis (Récluz, 1852)  
 Dosinia concentrica (Born, 1778)  
 Petricola lapicida (Gmelin, 1791)

Class Cephalopoda 

Loliginidae - marine
 Loligo pealei (Lesueur, 1821  
 Lolliguncula brevis (Blainville, 1823)
 Sepioteuthis sepioidea (Blainville, 1823)  
 
Octopodidae - marine
 Octopus vulgaris Cuvier, 1797  
 Octopus joubini Robson, 1929  

Spirulidae - marine
 Spirula spirula (Linneo, 1758)

Thysanoteuthidae - marine
 Thysanoteuthys rhombus Troschel, 1857

Class Scaphopoda 
Dentaliidae - marine
 Dentalium laqueatum Verri1, 1885  

Siphonodentallidae - marine
 Cadulus quadridentatus (Dall, 1881)

Class Polyplacophora 

Chitonidae - marine
 Acanthopleura granulata (Gmelin, 1791)  
 Chiton marmoratus Gmelin, 1791  
 Chiton tuberculatus Linneo, 1758

See also 
 List of echinoderms of Venezuela
 List of Poriferans of Venezuela
 List of introduced molluscs of Venezuela
 List of marine molluscs of Venezuela
 List of non-marine molluscs of El Hatillo Municipality, Miranda, Venezuela
 List of non-marine molluscs of Venezuela
 List of birds of Venezuela
 List of mammals of Venezuela

References 

.
Falcón
Lists of biota of Venezuela
Venezuelas, Falcon State